John Paulson Creek is a stream in the U.S. state of Washington.

John Paulson Creek was named for an early settler.

See also
List of rivers of Washington

References

Rivers of Spokane County, Washington
Rivers of Whitman County, Washington
Rivers of Washington (state)